The Asian stubtail (Urosphena squameiceps) is a bird in the family Cettiidae. The species was first described by Robert Swinhoe in 1863. It breeds in Korea, Manchuria and Japan and winters to southern China and northern Southeast Asia. Its natural habitat is temperate forest.

Description
It is a small bird with a short tail.  Males and females are similar in color, as well as juveniles after fledging; they are brown all over with a paler underpart and a darker brown crest and eyeline.

Distribution and habitat
Breeding Asian stubtails reside in portions of northeastern Asia; non-breeding in parts of southeast Asia including Taiwan, southeastern China, Nepal and Philippines, preferring a habitat of undergrowth in evergreen broadleaf or lowland coniferous forest.

Behavior

Voice
Breeding males produce a high-pitched shee-shee-shee-shee or cee-cee-cee, while both males and females make a call similar to chott-chott-chott.

References

Asian stubtail
Asian stubtail
Birds of Japan
Birds of Korea
Birds of Manchuria
Asian stubtail
Taxonomy articles created by Polbot